There are over 9,000 Grade I listed buildings in England.  This page is a list of these buildings in the county of West Yorkshire, by metropolitan district.

Bradford

|}

Calderdale

|}

Kirklees

|}

Leeds

|}

Wakefield

|}

See also
:Category:Grade I listed buildings in West Yorkshire
Grade II* listed buildings in West Yorkshire

Notes

Sources
National Heritage List for England

References

External links